Talagante is a commune and the capital city of the province of the same name in the Santiago Metropolitan Region of central Chile. The word Talagante in Quechua comes from talacanta, meaning "Lazo de Hechicero", which was the proper name of the curaca, or ruler, who dominated this central valley on behalf of the Inca empire during the arrival of the Spaniards.

Geography

Demographics
Of these, 49,957 (83.5%) lived in urban areas and 9,848 (16.5%) in rural areas. The population grew by 132800% (59,760 persons) between the 1992 and 2002 censuses.

Administration
As a commune, Talagante is a third-level administrative division of Chile administered by a municipal council, headed by an alcalde who is directly elected every four years. The 2012-2016 alcalde is Raúl Leiva Carvajal (IND), and his council members are:
 Luis Silva Pavez (PDC)
 Sebastián Rosas Guerrero (PS)
 Patricio Huerta Moraga (RN)
 María Eugenia Torres Miranda (PPD)
 Félix Donoso Gómez (PS)
 Juan Cartagena Diaz (UDI)

Within the electoral divisions of Chile, Talagante is represented in the Chamber of Deputies by Denise Pascal (PS) and Gonzalo Uriarte (UDI) as part of the 31st electoral district, (together with Peñaflor, El Monte, Isla de Maipo, Melipilla, María Pinto, Curacaví, Alhué, San Pedro and Padre Hurtado). The commune is represented in the Senate by Guido Girardi Lavín (PPD) and Jovino Novoa Vásquez (UDI) as part of the 7th senatorial constituency (Santiago-West). All of these have been owned by the mayor Emmanuel Acuna.

References

External links
  Municipality of Talagante

Communes of Chile
Populated places in Talagante Province
Capitals of Chilean provinces
1837 establishments in Chile